The Municipal Hall of Anderlecht is the municipal hall building and the seat of that municipality of Brussels, Belgium. This site is served by Brussels-South railway station, as well as the tram stop / (on line 81).

See also

 Brussels Town Hall
 Forest Municipal Hall

References

Notes

Bibliography
 Jean Van Audenhove, Anderlechtenia, Les Rues d'Anderlecht (in French), CAFHA (1995), p. 80–81.
 Jean-Marie Delaunois, Benoît Schoonbroodt, Guide des communes de la Région Bruxelloise (in French), CFC-Editions (1998), p. 75–78.
 Marcel Jacobs, Anderlecht, gisteren en vandaag, au passé et au présent (in Dutch–French), Het Streekboek (1999), pp. 82.

Buildings and structures in Brussels
City and town halls in Belgium
Anderlecht
Protected heritage sites in Brussels
Renaissance Revival architecture in Belgium